The 2020 Big West Conference men's basketball tournament was to be the postseason men's basketball tournament for the Big West Conference of the 2019–20 NCAA Division I men's basketball season. It was scheduled be held from March 12 through March 14, 2020 at the Honda Center in Anaheim, California. It was cancelled on March 12 in the effort to contain the spread of the coronavirus.

Seeds
The top eight conference teams were eligible for the tournament. Teams were seeded by record within the conference, with a tiebreaker system to seed teams with identical conference records. Teams were to be reseeded after the quarterfinals.

Schedule and results

Bracket

Attendance

On March 10, due to concerns over the coronavirus pandemic, the Big West Conference announced that both the Men's and Women's Tournaments would be played without paid spectators.

References

Tournament
Big West Conference men's basketball tournament
Big West Conference men's basketball tournament
College sports tournaments in California
Basketball competitions in Anaheim, California
Big West Conference men's basketball tournament
Big West Conference men's basketball tournament